Meiyin Wang (Chinese: 王美尹) is an American theatre director, playwright and producer. She was the Festival Director of the Without Walls (WOW) Festival at La Jolla Playhouse in San Diego and the Co-Director of the Public Theater's Under the Radar Festival and Symposium in New York.

References 

Living people
American producers
American theatre directors of Chinese descent
American women dramatists and playwrights
American people of Taiwanese descent
Year of birth missing (living people)